American Idols Live! Tour 2004 was a summer concert tour featuring the Top 10 contestants of the third season of American Idol, which aired in 2004. The tour was sponsored by Kellogg's Pop-Tarts.  It was the third in the series the American Idols Tour.

Background
The tour started in Salt Lake City on July 14, 2004. Initially, 48 tour dates were planned, but two shows (Ames, Iowa and Fargo, North Dakota) were cancelled due to poor sales. and three shows were later added in Honolulu in response to demand from fans of Jasmine Trias and Camile Velasco, as well as one final show in Singapore.

Despite having three sell-out shows in Hawaii, the attendances for most of the shows were significantly lower than the first two tours.  Average number of tickets sold fell by 40% compared to Season 1 and 48% compared to Season 2.  Excluding Singapore, a total of 258,577 tickets were sold, grossing $11,400,424 according to Billboard.

Performers

Opening act
Tamyra Gray 
Joy Tobing

Setlist

"Knock on Wood" 
"Ex-Factor" 
"Superstition" 
"(Sweet Sweet Baby) Since You've Been Gone" 
"Come Fly with Me" 
"Ain't Too Proud to Beg" 
"My All" 
"How Will I Know" 
"Dreams" 
"River Deep, Mountain High" 
"Summertime" 
"Signed, Sealed, Delivered I'm Yours" 
"When Doves Cry" / "Kiss" / "U Got the Look" / "Diamonds and Pearls" / "Baby I'm a Star" / "Nothing Compares 2 U" / "Purple Rain"
"Old Time Rock and Roll" 
"My Funny Valentine" 
"Crazy Little Thing Called Love" 
"A Fool in Love" 
"I Heard It Through the Grapevine" 
"If I Ain't Got You" 
"Dangerously in Love" 
"Heartburn" 
"Hey Ya!" 
"What's Going On" 
"I Believe in a Thing Called Love" 
"All My Life" 
"Where Is the Love?"
"Hollywood Swinging"
"Soul Man" 
"Crazy In Love" 
"I Believe" 
"His Eye Is on the Sparrow" 
"Ain't No Mountain High Enough"

Tour dates

Cancellations and rescheduled shows

Box office score data

References

American Idol concert tours
2004 concert tours